Stephen Bloomer Balch (April 5, 1747 – September 7, 1833) was a Presbyterian minister and educator in Georgetown, which is now part of Washington, D.C.  In 1780, Balch established Georgetown Presbyterian Church, which was the second church in Georgetown.  He also served as headmaster of the Columbian Academy in Georgetown.

Early life
Balch was born on April 5, 1747, on his father James Balch's holding, "Bond's Hope," on the north side of Deer Creek in what was then Baltimore Co., but is now in Harford County, Maryland.  He attended the College of New Jersey (now Princeton University), where his classmates included Aaron Burr and William Bradford, and earned a Bachelor of Arts degree in 1774.  Soon thereafter, he became principal of the Lower Marlborough Academy in Calvert County in southern Maryland.  Balch also served in the American Revolutionary War.

Georgetown Presbyterian Church
In 1779, Balch was ordained as minister by the Presbyterian church.  After that, he arrived in Georgetown and briefly preached at the Georgetown Lutheran Church.  In 1780, he began preaching out of a small house near Bridge Street (now M Street), which was used during the week as a school.  Around this time, Balch also became headmaster of the Columbian Academy in Georgetown, which is where George Washington sent his nephews.

A building was constructed for the church on Bridge Street at Washington Street (30th Street) in 1782.  The church was expanded in 1793 and again in 1801, but the size was still insufficient.  A new structure was built in 1821, and the church later relocated to P Street the 1870s.  Many notable residents of Washington and Georgetown attended the church.  Balch preached to a large crowd after George Washington died.

Personal life

In 1781, Balch married Elizabeth Beall, who was the daughter of George Beall.  Balch had a home built in 1783 on Duck Lane (now 33rd Street).  Balch also owned an island in the Potomac River, as well as a  farm outside of Washington.  He spent the later years of his life living at 3302 N Street.

The Balches had eleven children including Harriet Balch (married 1st James Reid Wilson, and 2nd Gen. Alexander Macomb), Alfred Balch (Princeton, 1805), Lewis Penn Witherspoon Balch (Princeton, 1805), George Ninian Beall Balch, the Reverend Thomas Bloomer Balch (Princeton, 1813), Anne Eleanora Balch (married Capt. James Campbell Wilson), Elizabeth Maria Balch (married Rev. Septimus Tustin), Jane Whann Balch (married Rev. William Williamson) and Hezekiah James (died young) and Franklin (died young).

His wife died in 1827, and a year later at age 82 he married Elizabeth King, who survived the ceremony only eighteen days. In 1830 he married again to a widow, Mrs. Jane Parrott. Balch remained the pastor of Georgetown Presbyterian Church until his death in 1833. Balch was originally interred in the narthex of Georgetown Presbyterian Church at 30th and M Streets NW beneath a small pyramidal marble stone. His remains were disinterred and reburied at Presbyterian Burying Ground (the church's cemetery) in the spring of 1873. They were disinterred again and reburied at nearby Oak Hill Cemetery on June 18, 1874.

References

External links

1747 births
1833 deaths
History of Washington, D.C.
Princeton University alumni
Burials at Presbyterian Burying Ground 
Burials at Oak Hill Cemetery (Washington, D.C.)
People from Baltimore County, Maryland
People of Maryland in the American Revolution
People from Georgetown (Washington, D.C.)
Beall family of Maryland